Lorenzo van Kleef (born 26 January 2001) is a Dutch footballer who plays as a right-back for Tweede Divisie club Jong Sparta Rotterdam.

Professional career
On 3 April 2016, Van Kleef signed his first professional contract with ADO Den Haag. Van Kleef made his professional debut with ADO Den Haag in a 3-1 Eredivisie loss to PSV Eindhoven on 11 August 2019.

In May 2022, Van Kleef joined Jong Sparta Rotterdam, the reserve team of Sparta Rotterdam.

References

External links
 
 
 Ons Oranje U16 Profile

2001 births
Living people
Footballers from The Hague
Dutch footballers
Netherlands youth international footballers
Association football midfielders
ADO Den Haag players
FC Eindhoven players
Quick Boys players
Sparta Rotterdam players
Eredivisie players
Eerste Divisie players
Tweede Divisie players
Derde Divisie players